The 1977–78 Women's Football Association Cup was the eighth edition of the WFA Cup (Women's FA Cup), the national women's football knockout competition in England. It was organised by the Women's Football Association (WFA) and was named The Pony WFA Cup for sponsorship reasons. 

Queen's Park Rangers L.F.C. went into the season as the Cup's holders. They won their quarter-final against Warminster Wanderers, 4–1 at Eastcote. 

In a semi-final in April, Southampton Women's F.C. played against St Helens W.F.C. at Bedworth Oval.

The 1978 Final was won by Southampton against Queen's Park Rangers, the defending champions. The match, which ended in an 8–2 scoreline, set several scoring records for the WFA Cup/Women's FA Cup Final that still stand today: the highest total number of goals in a match; the highest margin of victory for any Cup-winner; and the most Final goals by one player, Pat Chapman, who scored six. The game was played at Slough Town F.C.

The 1978 Cup was Southampton's sixth title. After the final, the winning team were featured in a news report on Southern Television.

Final details

See also
 Women's FA Cup
 Women's World Invitational Tournament
 1977–78 FA Cup

References

Women's FA Cup seasons
Cup